Mohammad Jassem Khodayyir was Minister for Immigration in the cabinet appointed by the Interim Iraq Governing Council in September 2003. A Shia Muslim, Khodayyir is a member of the Supreme Islamic Iraqi Council.

References
 

Government ministers of Iraq
Living people
Year of birth missing (living people)
Islamic Supreme Council of Iraq politicians